The Sun Odyssey 380 is a French sailboat that was designed by Marc Lombard, Jean-Marc Piaton and the Jeanneau Design Office as a cruiser and first built in 2021.

Production
The design has been built by Jeanneau in France, since 2021 and remained in production in 2023.

Design
The Sun Odyssey 380 is a recreational keelboat, built predominantly of fiberglass, with wood trim and a hard chined hull. The hull is solid hand-laid fiberglass, while the deck is resin injected over a balsa core. It has a fractional sloop rig with a Selden mast and no backstay, a reverse  stem, a reverse transom with a drop-down tailgate swimming platform, dual internally mounted spade-type rudders controlled by two wheels and a fixed fin keel, optional shoal-draft keel or swing keel. It displaces  and carries  of cast iron ballast.

A bow thruster, square-topped mainsail and a bowsprit are factory options.

The design has sleeping accommodation for four to six people, with a double slanted island berth in the bow cabin, a "U"-shaped settee and a straight settee in the main cabin and one or two aft cabins, each with a double berth. If the second aft cabin is omitted the space is used for storage instead. The galley is located on the port side just forward of the companionway ladder. The galley is "L"-shaped and is equipped with a two-burner stove, an ice box and a double sink. A navigation station is opposite the galley, on the starboard side. One or two heads may be fitted, one in the bow cabin on the port side and one on the starboard side aft.

For sailing downwind and reaching the design may be equipped with a code 0 sail.

Operational history
The boat is supported by an active class club the Jeanneau Owners Network.

In a review for Yacht World, Zuzana Prochazka wrote, "we tested hull #2 and our sail took place in 10-18 knots on the flat waters of Chesapeake Bay – and yes, the wind was that fluky. The boat was equipped with Technique Voile sails and a shoal keel which was ideal for the Bay which is filled with skinny water surprises. At 60 degrees AWA, we reached 8.7 knots in 17 knots of breeze without a reef. You'd be hard pressed to make that speed in most boats with 20 more feet of waterline. More importantly, the boat never felt overpowered or uncomfortable. Hardening up to 30 degrees, we still made good 7.9 knots of speed in the same wind with the traditional hoist semi-battened mainsail. There's an option for in-mast furling and a self-tacking jib but we enjoyed the performance of our 110% genoa on a Facnor furler."

A 2021 review by George Day for Bluewater Sailing concluded, "a couple or a family of four will be quite comfortable living boat the SO 380 for extended cruises. Such comfort combined with the boat’s great sailing performance will make it an amazing platform for building family memories."

In a 2022 Cruising World review, Mark Pillsbury wrote, "first impressions count, and mine were definitely ­favorable as I approached the Jeanneau Sun Odyssey 380 with CW's Boat of the Year ­judges during October's United States Sailboat Show in Annapolis, Maryland. Something about the way the reverse bow’s knuckle hovered just above the water caught my eye. Toss in pronounced hull chines carried aft from amidships, a low-slung coachroof and a high-aspect rig, and this boat hinted at the potential for some serious giddyap-and-go."

See also
List of sailing boat types

References

External links

Keelboats
2020s sailboat type designs
Sailing yachts
Sailboat type designs by Marc Lombard Design
Sailboat type designs by Jean-Marc Piaton
Sailboat type designs by Jeanneau Design Office
Sailboat types built by Jeanneau